Periclimenes carinidactylus is a species of saltwater shrimp found in Australian coastal waters and was first described in 1969 by Alexander James Bruce.

References

External links
 Periclimenes carinidactylus images & occurrence data from GBIF

Palaemonidae
Crustaceans of the Pacific Ocean
Crustaceans described in 1969
Taxa named by Alexander James Bruce